Natalie Johanna Mei (10 January 1900 – 29 July 1975) was an Estonian painter and graphic artist.

Born on the Estonian island of Hiiumaa, Natalie Mei was one of three daughters of a ship's captain. All three sisters would become artists, with Natalie and older sister Lydia Mei achieving public prominence during the Neue Sachlichkeit (New Objectivity) period of Estonian art of the 1920s. Mei also worked as a costume designer and taught at the Tallinn Art Institute.

Mei is buried at the Rahumäe cemetery in Tallinn.

References

Pihlak, Elvi: Lydia Mei - Natüürmortide ja lillemaalide meister in: Kunst Vol. 1962,1 pgs 16–20. Tallinn.

1900 births
1975 deaths
Estonian women painters
20th-century Estonian painters
Costume designers
Burials at Rahumäe Cemetery
People from Hiiumaa Parish
20th-century Estonian women artists
Estonian women illustrators